Boulder Park is an unincorporated community in Imperial County, California. It lies at an elevation of 2923 feet (891 m) along Interstate 8. The Desert View Tower is located in Boulder Park.

References

Unincorporated communities in Imperial County, California
Unincorporated communities in California